Chanesar Town is a neighborhood in Karachi East district of Karachi, Pakistan. It was previously administered as part of Jamshed Town, which was disbanded in 2011.

Population 
Chanesar Town has a total population of 600,000.

Demography 
There are several ethnic groups including Muhajirs, Punjabis, Sindhis, Kashmiris, Seraikis, Pakhtuns, Balochis, Memons, Bohras Ismailis and Christians.

References

External links 
 Karachi Website.

Neighbourhoods of Karachi
Jamshed Town